Prabha Thakur (born 10 September 1949) is an Indian politician. She is a member of the Indian National Congress party. She is a Member of the Parliament of India representing Rajasthan in the Rajya Sabha, the upper house of the Indian Parliament. She is also the president of the All India Mahila Congress. She is a Hindi poet and social worker.

Career 
Thakur was a member of 12th Lok Sabha from Ajmer constituency in Rajasthan from 1998 to 1999. In 2009, she was openly critical of the Left Front rule of the state of Bengal, saying that crimes against women have been growing in the previous 33 years of rule. In 2014, she was part of a group of women who supported an Aam Sabha for the 33% Women's Reservation Bill. She stated that the bill would help "empower Indian women socially, economically and politically."

Thakur has spoken out on other women's issues, calling for stricter anti-rape provisions in India. Thakur was also a supporter of laws against 'honour killings.' She has responded to comments about implementing dress codes to combat incidents of rape and has been quoted saying, "The question is not about the dress code, but the mentality of men. What the girls should wear should be the concern of the girl, her parents and her family only. I don't think there is a need for anyone else to say anything about how a girl should behave." Thakur believes instead, that as more women see rapists being dealt "justice," they will be more likely to file cases against assailants. She has previously spoken out about the amount of violent crime against women in Delhi.

References

External links
 Detailed Profile in india.gov.in website

1949 births
Living people
Indian National Congress politicians from Rajasthan
Rajya Sabha members from Rajasthan
India MPs 1998–1999
Lok Sabha members from Rajasthan
Women in Rajasthan politics
20th-century Indian women politicians
20th-century Indian politicians
People from Ajmer district
Women members of the Lok Sabha
Women members of the Rajya Sabha

Charan